Ytteren Church is a parish church of the Church of Norway in Rana Municipality in Nordland county, Norway.  It is located in the village of Ytteren, a northern suburb of the town of Mo i Rana. It is the main church for the Nord-Rana parish which is part of the Indre Helgeland prosti (deanery) in the Diocese of Sør-Hålogaland. The brick church was built in a rectangular style in 1977 using plans drawn up by the architect Nils Toft. The church seats about 500 people. The church was consecrated on 4 September 1977 by Bishop Bjarne Odd Weider.

Media gallery

See also
List of churches in Sør-Hålogaland

References

Rana, Norway
Churches in Nordland
Brick churches in Norway
20th-century Church of Norway church buildings
Churches completed in 1977
1977 establishments in Norway
Rectangular churches in Norway